The 2016–17 Botola 2 was the 55th season of Botola 2, the second division of the Moroccan football league.

Team change

Teams relegated from 2015–16 Botola
 MC Oujda
 Maghreb Fès

Teams promoted from 2015–16 GNFA 1
 Rapide Oued Zem
 Union Sidi Kacem

Table 

Botola seasons